International trade is the exchange of capital, goods, and services across international borders or territories because there is a need or want of goods or services. (see: World economy)

In most countries, such trade represents a significant share of gross domestic product (GDP). While international trade has existed throughout history (for example Uttarapatha, Silk Road, Amber Road, scramble for Africa, Atlantic slave trade, salt roads), its economic, social, and political importance has been on the rise in recent centuries.

Carrying out trade at an international level is a complex process when compared to domestic trade. When trade takes place between two or more states factors like currency, government policies, economy, judicial system, laws, and markets influence trade.

To ease and justify the process of trade between countries of different economic standing in the modern era, some international economic organizations were formed, such as the World Trade Organization. These organizations work towards the facilitation and growth of international trade. Statistical services of intergovernmental and supranational organizations and governmental statistical agencies publish official statistics on international trade.

Characteristics of global trade 
A product that is transferred or sold from a party in one country to a party in another country is an export from the originating country, and an import to the country receiving that product.  Imports and exports are accounted for in a country's current account in the balance of payments.

Trading globally may give consumers and countries the opportunity to be exposed to new markets and  products. Almost every kind of product can be found in the international market, for example: food, clothes, spare parts, oil, jewellery, wine, stocks, currencies, and water. Services are also traded, such as in tourism, banking, consulting, and transportation.

Advanced technology (including transportation), globalization, industrialization, outsourcing and multinational corporations have major impacts on the international trade systems

Differences from domestic trade 

International trade is, in principle, not different from domestic trade as the motivation and the behavior of parties involved in a trade do not change fundamentally regardless of whether trade is across a border or not.

However, in practical terms, carrying out trade at an international level is typically a more complex process than domestic trade. The main difference is that international trade is typically more costly than domestic trade. This is due to the fact that cross-border trade typically incurs additional costs such as explicit tariffs as well as explicit or implicit non-tariff barriers such as time costs (due to border delays), language and cultural differences, product safety, the legal system, and so on.

Another difference between domestic and international trade is that factors of production such as capital and labor are often more mobile within a country than across countries. Thus, international trade is mostly restricted to trade in goods and services, and only to a lesser extent to trade in capital, labour, or other factors of production. Trade in goods and services can serve as a substitute for trade in factors of production. Instead of importing a factor of production, a country can import goods that make intensive use of that factor of production and thus embody it. An example of this is the import of labor-intensive goods by the United States from China. Instead of importing Chinese labor, the United States imports goods that were produced with Chinese labor. One report in 2010, suggested that international trade was increased when a country hosted a network of immigrants, but the trade effect was weakened when the immigrants became assimilated into their new country.

History

The history of international trade chronicles notable events that have affected trading among various economies.

Theories and models

There are several models that seek to explain the factors behind international trade, the welfare consequences of trade and the pattern of trade.

Most traded export products

Largest countries or regions by total international trade

The following table is a list of the 21 largest trading states according to the World Trade Organization.

{| class="wikitable sortable" style="text-align: right"
|- bgcolor="#ececec" valign=top
! data-sort-type="number" style="width:5%"|Rank !! style="width:20%"|State !! style="width:25%" |International trade ofgoods (billions of USD) !! style="width:25%"|International trade ofservices (billions of USD) !! style="width:25%"|Total international tradeof goods and services(billions of USD)
|-
| – || World || 32,430 || 9,635 || 42,065
|-
| – ||align=left| || 4,664 || 1,881 || 6,545
|-
| 1 ||align=left| || 3,706 || 1,215 || 4,921
|-
| 2 ||align=left| || 3,686 || 656 || 4,342
|-
| 3 ||align=left| || 2,626 || 740 || 3,366
|-
| 4 ||align=left| || 1,066 || 571 || 1,637
|-
| 5 ||align=left| || 1,250 || 350 || 1,600
|-
| 6 ||align=left| || 1,074 || 470 || 1,544
|-
| 7 ||align=left| || 1,073 || 339 || 1,412
|-
| 8 ||align=left| || 1,064 || 172 || 1,236
|-
| 9 ||align=left| || 902 || 201 || 1,103
|-
| 10 ||align=left| || 866 || 200 || 1,066
|-
| 11 ||align=left| || 807 || 177 || 984
|-
| 12 ||align=left| || 763 || 212 || 975
|-
| 13 ||align=left| || 623 || 294 || 917
|-
| 13 ||align=left| || 613 || 304 || 917
|-
| 15 ||align=left| || 771 || 53 || 824
|-
| 16 ||align=left| || 596 || 198 || 794
|-
| 17 ||align=left| || 572 || 207 || 779
|-
| 18 ||align=left| || 511 || 93 || 604
|-
| 19 ||align=left| || 473 || 122 || 595
|-
| 20 ||align=left| || 248 || 338 || 586
|-
| 21 ||align=left| || 491 || 92 || 583
|}

Top traded commodities by value (exports)

Source: International Trade Centre

Observances
In the US, the various U.S. Presidents have held observances to promote big and small companies to be more involved with the export and import of goods and services. President George W. Bush observed World Trade Week on May 18, 2001, and May 17, 2002. Alt URL On May 13, 2016, President Barack Obama proclaimed May 15 through May 21, 2016, World Trade Week, 2016. On May 19, 2017, President Donald Trump proclaimed May 21 through May 27, 2017, World Trade Week, 2017. World Trade Week is the third week of May. Every year the President declares that week to be World Trade Week.

International trade versus local production
Local food
In the case of not the food production trade-offs in forms of local food and distant food production are controversial with limited studies comparing environmental impact and scientists cautioning that regionally specific environmental impacts should be considered. Effects of local food on greenhouse gas emissions may vary per origin and target region of the production. According to the 2022 IPCC report on climate change, that in international trade net Carbon emissions has reduced between 2006 and 2016.  A 2020 study indicated that local food crop production alone cannot meet the demand for most food crops with "current production and consumption patterns" and the locations of food production at the time of the study for 72–89% of the global population and 100–km radiuses as of early 2020. Studies found that food miles are a relatively minor factor of carbon emissions, albeit increased food localization may also enable additional, more significant, environmental benefits such as recycling of energy, water, and nutrients. For specific foods regional differences in harvest seasons may make it more environmentally friendly to import from distant regions than more local production and storage or local production in greenhouses.

Qualitative differences and economic aspects
Qualitative differences between substitutive products of different production regions may exist due to different legal requirements and quality standards or different levels of controllability by local production- and governance-systems which may have aspects of security beyond resource security, environmental protection, product quality and product design and health. The process of transforming supply as well as labor rights may differ as well.

Local production has been reported to increase local employment in many cases. A 2018 study claimed that international trade can increase local employment. A 2016 study found that local employment and total labor income in both manufacturing and nonmanufacturing were negatively affected by rising exposure to imports.

Local production in high-income countries, rather than distant regions may require higher wages for workers. Higher wages incentivize automation which could allow for automated workers' time to be reallocated by society and its economic mechanisms or be converted into leisure-like time.

Specialization, production efficiency and regional differences
Local production may require knowledge transfer, technology transfer and may not be able to compete in efficiency initially with specialized, established industries and businesses, or in consumer demand without policy measures such as eco-tariffs. Regional differences may cause specific regions to be more suitable for a specific production, thereby increasing the advantages of specific trade over specific local production. Forms of local products that are highly localized may not be able to meet the efficiency of more large-scale, highly consolidated production in terms of efficiency, including environmental impact.

Resource security

A systematic, and possibly first large-scale, cross-sectoral analysis of water, energy and land in security in 189 countries that links total and sectorial consumption to sources showed that countries and sectors are highly exposed to over-exploited, insecure, and degraded such resources with economic globalization having decreased security of global supply chains. The 2020 study finds that most countries exhibit greater exposure to resource risks via international trade – mainly from remote production sources – and that diversifying trading partners is unlikely to help countries and sectors to reduce these or to improve their resource self-sufficiency.

 Illicit trade 
 Illegal gold trade 
A number of people in Africa, including children, were using informal or “artisanal” methods to produce gold. While millions were making a livelihood through the small-scale mining, governments of Ghana, Tanzania and Zambia complaint about the increase in illegal production and gold smuggling. Sometimes the procedure involved criminal operations and even human and environmental cost. Investigative reports based on Africa’s export data revealed that gold in large quantities is smuggled out of the country through the United Arab Emirates, without any taxes being paid to the producing states. Analysis also reflected discrepancies in the amount exported from Africa and the total gold imported into the UAE.

In July 2020, a report by Swissaid highlighted that the Dubai-based precious metal refining firms, including Kaloti Jewellery International Group and Trust One Financial Services (T1FS), received most of their gold from poor African states like Sudan. The gold mines in Sudan were seldom under the militias involved in war crimes and human rights abuses. The Swissaid report also highlighted that the illicit gold coming into Dubai from Africa is imported in large quantities by the world’s largest refinery in Switzerland, Valcambi. 

Another report in March 2022 revealed the contradiction between the lucrative gold trade of West African countries and the illicit dealings. Like Sudan, Democratic Republic of Congo (DRC), Ghana and other states, differences were recorded in the gold production in Mali and its trade with Dubai, UAE. The third largest gold exporter in Africa, Mali imposed taxes only on first 50kg gold exports per month, which allowed several small-scale miners to enjoy tax exemptions and smuggle gold worth millions. In 2014, Mali’s gold production was of 45.8 tonnes, while the UAE’s gold import were at 59.9 tonnes. 

See also

 
 
 
 
 
 
 
 
 
 
 
 
 
 
 
 
 
 
 
 
 
 
 United Nations Conference on Trade and Development (UNCTAD)

Lists
 List of countries by current account balance
 List of countries by imports
 List of countries by exports
 List of international trade topics

References

Further reading
 Nelson, Scott Reynolds. Oceans of Grain: How American Wheat Remade the World'' (2022) excerpt

Sources

External links

Data

Statistics from intergovernmental sources
Data on the value of exports and imports and their quantities often broken down by detailed lists of products are available in statistical collections on international trade published by the statistical services of intergovernmental and supranational organisations and national statistical institutes. The definitions and methodological concepts applied for the various statistical collections on international trade often differ in terms of definition (e.g. special trade vs. general trade) and coverage (reporting thresholds, inclusion of trade in services, estimates for smuggled goods and cross-border provision of illegal services). Metadata providing information on definitions and methods are often published along with the data.
 United Nations Commodity Trade Database
 Trade Map, trade statistics for international business development
 WTO Statistics Portal
 Statistical Portal: OECD
 European Union International Trade in Goods Data
 Food and Agricultural Trade Data by FAO

Other external links
 The MIT Observatory of Economic Complexity
 The McGill Faculty of Law runs a Regional Trade Agreements Database that contains the text of almost all preferential and regional trade agreements in the world.  ptas.mcgill.ca
 Historical documents on international trade available on FRASER (St Louis Fed)

 
Official statistics